Let Yourself Go is the first 12" single by English electronic music group 808 State, released in 1988. The cover depicts a Matryoshka doll in the shape of a bear.

Track listing

Side A
"Let Yourself Go (303 Mix)" – 6:14
"Let Yourself Go (D 50 Mix)" – 4:23

Side B
"Deepville" – 7:24

"Deepville" was originally titled "Sxmatic".

See also
1988 in music

References

1988 debut singles
1988 songs
808 State songs